Guy Urban Hardy (April 4, 1872 – January 26, 1947) was a U.S. Representative from Colorado for fourteen years. He was a newspaper editor and publisher for 52 years as well as president of the National Editorial Association. Three parks were established in Cañon City, Colorado as the result of his lobbying efforts: Royal Gorge Park, Temple Canyon Park, and Red Canyon Park. The Guy U. Hardy award was established to recognize individuals who preserve, protect, and advocate for outdoor recreational opportunities.

Early life and education
Born in Abingdon, Illinois, Hardy had two brothers. He attended the public schools, Albion Normal College in Albion, Illinois, and Transylvania University, Lexington, Kentucky.

Career
He taught school in Illinois and Florida from 1890 to 1893. He had tuberculosis and moved to Cañon City, Colorado for the dry climate in 1894. He was the editor and later publisher and owner of the Cañon City Daily Record and Cañon City Weekly Record, beginning in 1895. Initially, there was a weekly paper, and by 1906 Hardy also published a daily newspaper. Appointed to the post by President William McKinley, he was postmaster of Cañon City from June 5, 1900, to July 30, 1904. He was president of the National Editorial Association in 1918 and 1919.

He lobbied Congress in 1906 to establish a  park at Royal Gorge by having the land ceded to the City of Cañon City. Royal Gorge Park was created due to his efforts, as were Temple Canyon Park in 1912 and also Red Canyon Park. He was also a leader in the local Chamber of Commerce.

Hardy was elected as a Republican to the 66th Congress and to the six succeeding Congresses (March 4, 1919 – March 3, 1933).  He was an unsuccessful candidate for reelection in 1932 to the 73rd Congress. While in Congress, he prepared documents regarding the responsibilities of Congressmen and about Congress.

He resumed his former publishing pursuits in Cañon City, Colorado. He founded the University Club of Cañon City.

Personal life
On August 2, 1899, he married Jessie Mack (born May 7, 1875 Cañon City), the daughter of early pioneers of Cañon City, Julia E. (Little) and Henry Mack. Jessie received her Bachelor of Philosophy (Ph.B.) at the University of Michigan in 1898, after which she taught Latin and English at the Cañon City High School. She was a suffragette and involved in a number of community organizations. She also taught kindergarten.

The Hardys had four children, daughter Marion and sons Max, Lyman, and Don. He resided in Cañon City, Colorado until his death on January 26, 1947. He was interred in Greenwood Cemetery. After his death, his son Don ran the newspapers.

The Guy U. Hardy Award for Service to Outdoor Recreation was created in his name to recognize people in the community who "help preserve, protect and advocate for providing outdoor recreation opportunities." Hardy had a significant impact on outdoor recreational opportunities in the Royal Gorge area.

References

External links 
 

1872 births
1947 deaths
Transylvania University alumni
American Disciples of Christ
Republican Party members of the United States House of Representatives from Colorado
People from Abingdon, Illinois
People from Cañon City, Colorado